Rhinecliff Hotel is a historic hotel located at Rhinecliff, Dutchess County, New York. It was built about 1855 and is a two to three story, "L" shaped frame building. It is built into the side of a steep hill and features a two-story verandah and cross-gable roof.  Also on the property is a contributing carriage shed / garage.

It was added to the National Register of Historic Places in 1987.

References

External links
Rhinecliff Hotel history

Hotel buildings on the National Register of Historic Places in New York (state)
Hotel buildings completed in 1855
Buildings and structures in Dutchess County, New York
National Register of Historic Places in Dutchess County, New York